Bagh-e Chenar (also Romanized as Bāgh-e Chenār and Bāghchenār) is a village in Kuh Shah Rural District, Ahmadi District, Hajjiabad County, Hormozgan Province, Iran. At the 2006 census, its population was 190, in 53 families.

References 

Populated places in Hajjiabad County